Hochul is a surname. Notable people with the surname include:

Kathy Hochul (born 1958), American lawyer and politician
William J. Hochul Jr. (born 1959), American politician